Joseph ("Joe") Smartt (born in West Ham, London, on 9 September 1931; died in Hedge End, South Hampshire, on 7 June 2013), was a British geneticist with major contributions to the knowledge of crop evolution, especially of grain legumes.

Education and early professional life 
He received his primary education at the Forest Gate primary school.
Smartt then completed a degree in botany from Durham University, graduating in 1952. He was a member of Hatfield College. He subsequently studied at Cambridge University (Christ's College) for a diploma in agricultural science. Afterwards, he went to Northern Rhodesia (now Zambia), where he worked on groundnuts. He completed his PhD in the Department of Genetics at North Carolina State University (NCSU) in 1965. His thesis was on "Cross-compatibility relationships between the cultivated peanut Arachis hypogaea L. and other species of the genus Arachis".

Professional life 
He worked in plant breeding programs in Africa. 
After returning to England, he was employed by the Department of Botany of Southampton University from 1967 to 1996. Initially, he was a Lecturer in Genetics, while achieving the status of Reader in Biology in 1990. Southampton University honoured Smartt by awarding him a Doctor of Science (DSc) in 1989 for his work on the genetics and evolution of crop plants.

Smartt authored two books on grain legumes, edited a major volume on groundnuts, and was invited to co-edit a second edition of the important Evolution of Crop Plants with the late Professor Norman Simmonds.

Bibliography (selection)

On fish 
Smartt, J. (2008). Goldfish Varieties and Genetics: Handbook for Breeders. John Wiley & Sons.

Smartt, J. (2007). A possible genetic basis for species replacement: preliminary results of interspecific hybridisation between native crucian carp Carassius carassius (L.) and introduced goldfish Carassius auratus (L.). Aquatic Invasions 2(1):59–62.

Smartt, J. & Bundell, J. H. (1996). Goldfish breeding and genetics. TFH.

On the evolution of crop plants and grain legumes

Books 

Nwokolo, E. & Smartt, J. (Eds.). (1996). Food and feed from legumes and oilseeds. Chapman & Hall, London.

Simmonds, N. W. & Smartt, J. (1999). Principles of crop improvement, 2nd edn. Blackwell Science, Oxford.

Smartt, J. & Simmonds, N. W. (1995). Evolution of crop plants, 2nd edn. Longman Scientific & Technical.

Smartt, J. (1994). The groundnut crop: a scientific basis for improvement. Chapman & Hall Ltd.

Smartt, J. (1990). Grain legumes: evolution and genetic resources. Cambridge University Press.

Smartt, J. (1976). Tropical pulses. Longman Group Limited.

Smartt, J. (1965), Cross-compatibility relationships between the cultivated peanut Arachis hypogaea L. and other species of the genus Arachis. PhD thesis, North Carolina State University.

Scientific articles 

Erskine, W., Smartt, J. & Muehlbauer, F. J. (1994). Mimicry of lentil and the domestication of common vetch and grass pea. Economic Botany 48(3):326–332.

Harder, D. K. & Smartt, J. (1992). Further evidence on the origin of the cultivated winged bean, Psophocarpus tetragonolobus (L.) DC.(Fabaceae): Chromosome numbers and the presence of a host-specific fungus. Economic Botany 46(2):187–191.

Smartt, J. (1986). Evolution of grain legumes. VI. The future—the exploitation of evolutionary knowledge. Experimental Agriculture 22:39–58.

Smartt, J. (1985d). Evolution of grain legumes. V. The oilseeds. Experimental Agriculture 21:305–319.

Smartt, J. (1985c). Evolution of grain legumes. IV. Pulses in the genus Phaseolus. Experimental Agriculture 21:193–207.

Smartt, J. (1985b). Evolution of grain legumes. III. Pulses in the genus Vigna. Experimental Agriculture 21:87–100.

Smartt, J. (1985a). Evolution of grain legumes. II. Old and New World pulses of lesser economic importance. Experimental Agriculture 21:1–18.

Smartt, J. (1984). Evolution of grain legumes I. Mediterranean pulses. Experimental Agriculture 20:275–296.

Smartt, J. (1980). Some observations on the origin and evolution of the winged bean (Psophocarpus tetragonolobus). Euphytica 29(1):121–123.

References 

British geneticists
Alumni of the University of Cambridge
Alumni of Christ's College, Cambridge
Alumni of Hatfield College, Durham
North Carolina State University alumni
1931 births
2013 deaths